Ponneri is a town located  in  Chennai Metropolitan Region, Thiruvallur district in the Indian state of Tamil Nadu. It is located in Ponneri taluk. Ponneri is major destination for Andhra Pradesh people to buy goods.

Geography 
It has an average elevation of 16 metres (52 feet).

Demographics 
 India census, Ponneri had a population of 24,205. Males constitute 50% of the population and females 50% and with Minjur population, with postal code 601204, considered it could be of 50,000 as ponneri state offices governs most of state implementations on all blocks under ponneri taluk. Neighbouring towns are Minjur, Redhills, Gummidipoondi and Athipattu with development underway on NCTPS power plant project. Ponneri is on the banks of the Arani river. Ponneri is located 33 km north of Chennai and 52 km Northwest of Thiruvallur. Ponneri has an average literacy rate of 73%, higher than the national average of 59.5%.  Approximately 81% of males and 66% of females are literate. About 10% of the population is under 6 years of age.

Politics
Ponneri assembly constituency (SC) is part of Thiruvallur (Lok Sabha constituency).

Transport

The neighbourhood is served by the Ponneri railway station of the Chennai Suburban Railway Network.

Outer Ring Road 
A 62.3 km long road connecting NH 32 / GST road at Vandalur, NH 48 (GWT Road) at Nazarethpettai, NH 716 (CTH Road) at Nemilichery to NH 16 (GNT Road) at Nallur and to TPP road at Minjur. It is developed in 2 Phases by CMA. Phase 1 (29.5 km) was open to public on 29 August 2014. Expected completion of 2nd Phase (33.1 km) is Dec 2018. Ongoing outer ring road (Expected completion by Dec 2018) is passing at a distance of 9 km (from Ponneri ) near Minjur.

Chennai Peripheral Ring Road (CPRR) 
A 162 km long (5 sections, 100 m wide, 6 lane carriage way and 2 service lanes) connects Pooncheri with Kattupalli in Tiruvallur district. Estimated cost of ₹12,500 crore with INR 3216 Cr funding from the Japan International Cooperation Agency (JICA). Phase 1: A 25-km stretch from Kattupalli Port to Thachur with a 3-km link road to the Chennai Outer Ring Road at Neithavoyal is expected to begin in year 2020.

Health 

Ponneri has medical facilities, including government-run and private hospitals, private clinic and Diagnostic centre. The government-aided hospitals include a General Hospital.

References 

 

Cities and towns in Tiruvallur district
Smart cities in India